is a Sterling Professor of Immunobiology and Molecular, Cellular and Developmental Biology at Yale University. She is also a principal investigator at the Howard Hughes Medical Institute. Her research interests include innate immunity, autophagy, inflammasomes, sexually transmitted infections, herpes simplex virus, human papillomavirus, respiratory virus infections, influenza infection, T cell immunity, commensal bacteria, COVID-19 and Long COVID.

Iwasaki was elected to the National Academy of Sciences in 2018.

Biography
Iwasaki was born and raised in Iga, Japan by her father Hiroshi, a physicist, and mother Fumiko, who fought for women's rights in the workplace. She has two sisters. After high school she moved to Toronto, Canada, where in 1994, she received her bachelor's degree in biochemistry and physics from the University of Toronto.  She had hopes of becoming a mathematician or physicist like her father. However, her interests changed after taking an immunology class. 

Iwasaki earned her doctoral degree in immunology from the University of Toronto in 1998. Iwasaki did her postdoctoral fellow at the National Institutes of Health in the lab of mucosal immunologist Brian Lee Kelsall. In 2000, she started her own lab at Yale University. In 2022, Iwasaki was awarded a Sterling Professorship, the highest academic honor professors receive at Yale University.

Major contributions
 
   
While working on her PhD project of how DNA vaccines elicit an immune response, Iwasaki was among the first to show that antigen-presenting cells were in the blood, not the muscle. At the time scientists thought muscle cells were essential for alerting the immune system of foreign proteins, or antigens, coded for by the vaccines because the DNA vaccines work best when injected into the muscle.

Iwasaki's research continues to focus on understanding innate immunity and how that information is used to produce protective adaptive immunity. Iwasaki and her team study immune responses to influenza in the lungs and herpes simplex virus in the genital tract. Overall, the goal is to design effective vaccines or microbiocides for the prevention of transmission of viral and bacterial pathogens. Iwasaki has developed a two-stage vaccination strategy called "prime and pull" that involves a conventional vaccine as a first step and then application of chemokines to the target tissue as a second step. Based on this strategy, Iwasaki has developed a vaccine that is currently in a clinical trial to treat women with precancerous lesions in the cervix to prevent cervical cancer. Serving on Yale University's Science Strategy Committee, Iwasaki has advocated for harnessing the beneficial aspects of inflammation to "combat widespread diseases like stroke, heart disease, and diabetes".

Building on her interests in immune responses to viral infection, Iwasaki has also led research into human rhinovirus and Zika virus. Iwasaki's group was notably the first to create a mouse model of a vaginal Zika infection. Most recently, Iwasaki has delved into research looking at the immune response of COVID-19 patients and sex differences in SARS-CoV-2 infection. She is also examining the effects of Long COVID and other syndromes that occur following acute infections.

According to Google Scholar, one of her publications, "Toll-like receptor control of the adaptive immune response," has been cited over 4,660 times as of July 2020 and was published in Nature Immunology in October 2004. In January 2015, one of Iwasaki's studies was published in the Proceedings of the National Academy of Sciences. The study, "Temperature-dependent innate defense against the common cold virus limits viral replication at warm temperature in mouse airway cells", investigates the relationship between temperature and immune responses.

Personal life 
Iwasaki is well known as an advocate for women in science, including voicing support for affordable childcare. Additionally, she has spoken out in support of immigrants and their contributions to science. Iwasaki has gained a following on Twitter for her public health advice about COVID-19, advocating for social distancing early in the pandemic.

She is married to Ruslan Medzhitov, a professor of immunobiology at Yale School of Medicine. They have two daughters, Emi and Naomi.

Honors
 Burroughs Wellcome Fund Career Award in Biomedical Sciences, Burroughs Wellcome Fund (2000)
Ethel Donaghue Women's Health Program Investigator Award, Ethel Donaghue Women's Health Program (2003)
 Wyeth Lederle Young Investigator Award, Infectious Diseases Society of America (2003)
 Burroughs Wellcome Fund Investigator in Pathogenesis in Infectious Diseases, Burroughs Wellcome Fund (2005) 
BD Biosciences Investigator Award, American Associations of Immunologist (AAI) (2011)
Eli Lilly and Company Research Award, American Society of Microbiology (2012)
Inspiring Yale award (2017)
Yale's Charles W. Bohmfalk Teaching Award (2018)
Seymour & Vivian Milstein Award for Excellence in Interferon & Cytokine Research, International Cytokine and Interferon Society (2019)
Elected as a member of the American Academy of Arts and Sciences
Appointed Sterling Professor of Immunobiology and of Molecular, Cellular & Developmental Biology at Yale (2022)

Publications

References

1970 births
Living people
Japanese academics
University of Toronto alumni
Yale University faculty
Yale Sterling Professors
Howard Hughes Medical Investigators
People from Mie Prefecture
Members of the United States National Academy of Sciences
American academics of Japanese descent
American immunologists
Fellows of the American Academy of Microbiology
Members of the National Academy of Medicine